I-War may also refer to:

 I-War (1995 video game), a shoot 'em up video game
 I-War (1997 video game), a space combat simulator video game
 iWar, the term used by NATO to describe a form of Internet-based warfare